A dynastic order, monarchical order, or house order is an order under royal patronage. Such an order is bestowed by, as a legitimate , a sovereign or the head of a once-sovereign ruling family. These are often considered part of the cultural patrimony of the ruling family. Dynastic orders were often founded or maintained to reward service to a monarch or their subsequent dynasty.

A national or state order is the equivalent term for orders (e.g., of merit) conferred by sovereign states but not bestowed by ruling dynasties.

In personal gift of sovereign
Dynastic orders are under the exclusive control of a monarch and are bestowed without the advice of the political leadership (prime minister or cabinet). A recent report by the British Government mentioned that there is "one remaining exercise that has been identified of the Monarch's truly personal, executive prerogative: that is, the conferment of certain honours that remain within [the Sovereign’s] gift (the Orders of Merit, of the Garter, of the Thistle and the Royal Victorian Order)."

Generally, dynastic or house Orders are granted by the monarch for whatever reason the monarch may deem appropriate whereas other orders, often called Merit Orders, are granted on the recommendation of government officials to recognize individual accomplishments or services to the nation.

Portugal
The term dynastic order is also used for those orders that continue to be bestowed by former monarchs and their descendants after they have been removed from power. For instance, the website of Duarte Pio de Bragança, a pretender to the throne of Portugal using the title Duke of Braganza, asserts that the Order of the Immaculate Conception of Vila Viçosa, "being a Dynastic Order of the House of Bragança and not an Order of State, continued to be conferred by the last King Dom Manuel II, in the exile." On the basis of his succession to King Manuel II, Duarte Pio continues to award those orders of the Kingdom of Portugal not taken over by the Portuguese Republic.

The Portuguese Republic views things somewhat differently, regarding all the royal orders as extinct following the 5 October 1910 revolution with some of them revived in republican form in 1918. For official purposes, Portugal simply ignores the orders awarded by the royal pretender, Duarte Pio. Although no one is prosecuted for accepting orders from Dom Duarte, including himself, Portuguese law requires government permission to accept any official award, either from Portugal or foreign powers; the awards of Dom Duarte simply do not appear anywhere on either list.

Italy
A similar situation exists in Italy, where the Republican Government regards the orders of the former kings to have been abolished but the last king's heir continues to award them. However, the Italian situation is unique, since the Order of Saints Maurice and Lazarus is one of the few orders of knighthood that has been explicitly recognized by a papal bull, in which Pope Gregory XII gave the House of Savoy the right to confer that knighthood in perpetuity. Thus, under principles of international law, the Italian heir to the throne in exile asserts that control of the Savoy dynastic orders exists separate from the Kingdom of Italy so that he retains the right to award the orders, and accompanying privileges." The royal family of Savoy additionally have the Supreme Order of the Most Holy Annunciation which is their highest ranked order of Knighthood. In addition to this the Order of Merit of Savoy is a Dynastic order knighthood given out by the head of the Royal House of Savoy, Order of chivalry. Following the demise of the last reigning monarch Umberto II of Italy in 1983, the Order of the Crown of Italy was replaced in 1988 by the Order of Merit of Savoy which was instituted by his heir, the current head of the former Royal House, Vittorio Emanuele, Prince of Naples. While the Ordine al merito d'Savoia it has never been a national order, it is subsidiary to the Civil Order of Savoy which was the Order of Merit and it has around 2,000 members and, as with the Order of the Crown of Italy previously, it is entrusted to the Chancellor of the Order of Saints Maurice and Lazarus.

In addition to this Italy contains orders of the royal House of Bourbon-Two Sicilies which still confer their Dynastic Knightly orders. The most interesting of which is the Sacred Military Constantinian Order of Saint George because the Italian Republic recognises the order as an Order of Chivalry under Law n° 178 of 1951 authorises the Italian citizens awarded with the Constantinian decoration to show them as authoritatively recognised also by the Italian State Council in its decision number 1869/81. Therefore those citizens lawfully awarded with Constantinian decorations can ask to use them on the territory of the Italian Republic by Presidential Decree or Decree of the Ministry of Foreign Affairs. By Decree of the President of the Republic, in 1973 the National Italian Association of the Knights of the Sacred Military Constantinian Order of St. George. Additionally there is the Royal Order of Francis I of the Kingdom of the Two Sicilies. One branch of the family (led by Prince Carlo, Duke of Castro) claims that the Order of Francis I was attached to the crown not the state, and thus awards it as a dynastic order. The other branch (led by Infante Carlos, Duke of Calabria) regards the Order of Francis I as a state order that became extinct when the Borbon-Two Sicilies royal family accepted the abolition of their monarchy and the state's inclusion in the Kingdom of Italy.

Russia

A third situation of mutual co-existence is maintained in Russia, where, since the fall of communism, the orders of Saint Andrew, Saint George, and Saint Catherine have been reinvented as State Orders of Merit of the Russian Federation. However, the Russian Imperial Orders of Saint Andrew, Saint George, Saint Catherine, Saint Anna, Saint Vladimir, and Saint Stanislav have continued to be awarded since the revolution by the successive heads of the Imperial House of Romanov Grand Duke Kirill Vladimirovich, Grand Duke Vladimir Kirillovich, and Grand Duchess Maria Vladimirovna. In addition, Dynastic Orders of Knighthood were revived and new ones created under Grand Duke Kirill (Order of Saint Nicholas the Wonderworker), Grand Duke Vladimir (Order of St. Michael the Archangel), and Grand Duchess Maria Vladimirovna (Order of St. Anastasia). Awards of these honours are allowed to be worn in Russia, and enjoy semi-official recognition by the church and the state; for example, on 14 December 2001 the Ministry of Defence of the Russian Federation legalized the wearing of the Order of Saint Nicholas the Wonderworker in Russia by military persons on active duty.

Central Europe

In Central Europe, the head of the Habsburg family had the right to dispose of the Order of the Golden Fleece even after 1918. The very extensive treasure and the associated archive are in the Vienna Treasury. The Republic of Austria has expressly confirmed this. During the Nazi era, many Habsburg goods and orders were expropriated and dissolved. The USSR maintained this state of affairs during the Cold War to prevent any opposition among its oppressed peoples. After the collapse of communism, the order of St. George was reactivated by the Habsburg family as a Central European dynasty order. With both the Order of the Golden Fleece and the Order of St. George, deserved personalities are made knights today.

Various dynastic orders
There are many dynastic orders of knighthood, primarily in Europe. Today, dynastic orders include those still being bestowed by a reigning monarch, those bestowed by the head of a royal house in exile, and those that became extinct. Although it is sometimes asserted that the heads of former reigning houses retain the right to their dynastic orders but cannot create new ones, that view is challenged by others who believe that the power to create orders remains with a dynasty forever. In a few cases, formerly reigning families are accused of "fudging" the issue by claiming to revive long extinct orders or by changing non-dynastic state orders into dynastic ones. One example of this is the Order of Saint Michael of the Wing, which is sometimes described as a revival of a long dormant order last awarded in the eighteenth century but also described as a new order created in 2004. Finally, there is the example of a Russian pretender Maria Vladimirovna who published a decree on 20 August 2010 to create the entirely new Imperial Order of the Holy Great Martyr Anastasia.

Bestowed by the Holy See 

Although some former royal families and their supporters claim that Roman Catholic Church formally recognizes their right to award various orders, the Vatican denies all such assertions. On 16 October 2012, the Vatican Secretary of State renewed its formal announcement that it only recognizes the orders issued by the Pope, namely:

 Supreme Order of Christ
 Order of the Golden Spur
 Order of Pope Pius IX
 Order of Saint Gregory the Great
 Order of Pope Saint Sylvester

Under Papal protection 
 Order of the Holy Sepulchre
 Sovereign Military Order of Malta
 Teutonic Order

Explicitly Recognized by Papal Bull 

  Order of Saints Maurice and Lazarus

The Secretary of State cautioned that "other orders, whether of recent origin or mediaeval foundation, are not recognised by the Holy See...To avoid any possible doubts, even owing to illicit issuing of documents or the inappropriate use of sacred places, and to prevent the continuation of abuses which may result in harm to people of good faith, the Holy See confirms that it attributes absolutely no value whatsoever to certificates of membership or insignia issued by these groups, and it considers inappropriate the use of churches or chapels for their so-called 'ceremonies of investiture.'"

Bestowed by current sovereign monarch
 The Most Noble Order of the Garter (United Kingdom)
 The Noble Order of the Golden Fleece (Spain)
 The Order of the Gold Lion of the House of Nassau (The Netherlands as well as Luxembourg)
 The Royal Victorian Order (Commonwealth realms)
 The Order of the Elephant (Denmark)
 The Order of the Dannebrog (Denmark)
 The Order of Merit (Commonwealth realms)
 The Order of the House of Orange (The Netherlands)
 The Order of the Thistle (United Kingdom)
 The Order of the Seraphim (Sweden)
 The Order of St. Olav (Norway)
 The Order of Al-Hussein bin Ali (Jordan)

Bestowed by current reigning non-ruling monarch
 The Royal Order of the Omujwaara Kondo (Uganda, Kingdom of Bunyoro-Kitara: House of Babiito)
 The Royal Order of the Engabu (Uganda, Kingdom of Bunyoro-Kitara: House of Babiito)
 The Most Honourable Order of Omukama Chwa II Kabalega (Uganda, Kingdom of Bunyoro-Kitara: House of Babiito)

Bestowed by head of formerly reigning dynasty

The Order of Saint George (Bavaria-Wittelsbach) 
The Order of St. Hubert (Bavaria-Wittelsbach)
The Imperial Ethiopian Order of Saint Mary of Zion (Ethiopia)
The Order of the Holy Spirit (France)
The Order of Saint Michael (France) 
The Order of the Eagle of Georgia (Georgia, Bagrationi Dynasty)
The Royal Order of the Crown of Georgia Kingdom (Georgia, Nugzar Bagration-Gruzinsky)
The House Order of Hohenzollern (Hohenzollern, Germany)
The Order of Skanderbeg (Albania, House of Zogu)
The Imperial Austrian Order of Elizabeth (Habsburg-Lorraine)
The Noble Order of the Golden Fleece  (Habsburg-Lorraine)
The Order of the Starry Cross (Habsburg-Lorraine)
The Order of St. George (Habsburg-Lorraine)
The Order of Saint Stephen of Hungary (Hungary)
The Order of Prince Danilo I (Montenegro) 
The Order of Petrovic Njegos (Montenegro)
The Order of Saint Peter of Cetinje (Montenegro)
The Order of Saint George of Parma (Parma)
The Order of the Saint Louis for Civil Merit (Parma)
The Order of the Immaculate Conception of Vila Viçosa (Portugal, House of Braganza)
The Order of Saint Isabel (Portugal, House of Braganza)
The Order of Merit of the Portuguese Royal House (Portugal, House of Braganza)
The Order of Saint Michael of the Wing (Portugal, House of Braganza)
The Order of Carol I (Romania, order founded in 1906 and discontinued with King Michael's abdication in 1947, and then revived by him on 5 January 2005 as a dynastic order)
The Order of the Crown (Romania), founded as a state order it was revived by King Michael I as a Dynastic Order in 2011.
The Order of Saint Andrew (Imperial House of Russia)
The Order of Saint Catherine (Imperial House of Russia)
The Order of Saint Alexander Nevsky (Imperial House of Russia)
The Order of the White Eagle (Imperial House of Russia)
The Order of Saint Anna (Imperial House of Russia)
The Order of Saint Vladimir (Imperial House of Russia)
The Order of Saint Nicholas the Wonderworker (Imperial House of Russia, a modern order created in exile on 1 August 1929 by the pretender Kirill Vladimirovich, a cousin of the last Tsar, Nicholas II of Russia)
The Order of Saint Stanislav (Imperial House of Russia)
The Order of Saint Anastasia (Imperial House of Russia), a modern order created in exile in 2010 by the Head of the Imperial House.
The Order of Saint Michael the Archangel (Imperial House of Russia, a modern order created in exile in 1988 by the Head of the Imperial House Vladimir Kirillovich
The Royal Order of the Intare (Rwanda)
The Supreme Order of the Most Holy Annunciation (Savoy)
The Order of Saints Maurice and Lazarus (Savoy)
The Order of Merit of Savoy (Savoy)
The Order of Parfaite Amitié (Thurn and Taxis)
The Order of Saint Joseph (Tuscany)
The Sacred Military Constantinian Order of Saint George (Two Sicilies)
The Order of Saint Januarius (Two Sicilies)
The Royal and Hashemite Order of the Pearl (Sulu)
The Order of the Rose (Brazil, House of Orleans-Braganza)
The Order of the Southern Cross (Brazil, House of Orleans-Braganza)
The Imperial Order of Christ (Brazil, House of Orleans-Braganza)
The Order of Pedro I (Brazil, House of Orleans-Braganza)
The Order of the Rasulids (Royal House of Tahir Buruj of the Rasulid dynasty)
The Royal Order of the Crown (Hawaiian Kingdom, House of Keoua Nui)
The Royal Order of the Star of Oceania (Hawaiian Kingdom, House of Keoua Nui)

See also 
 Chivalric order
 Military order (monastic society)

References